Zhang Tian'ai (born 28 October 1988), also known by her English name Crystal Zhang, is a Chinese actress and model. She is best known for her breakout role in the 2015 hit web-drama Go Princess Go.

Early life and education
Zhang Tian'ai was born 28 October 1988 in Harbin, Heilongjiang. 
Zhang attended high school in Japan, majoring in costume design. She then enrolled in the Beijing Film Academy.

Career

2008–2014: Beginnings and rising popularity
In 2008, Zhang was invited by South Korean director Woody Han to star in Korean short film Cherry Blossom alongside Korean actor Kim Soo-hyun. After which, she continued to appear in minor supporting roles whilst working as an advertisement model. Zhang made her official acting debut in the drama The Second Life of My Husband, which aired in 2013.

Zhang first gained attention in 2014 when she acted alongside Sun Honglei in spy drama The Legendary Sniper. She won the Best Supporting Actress award at the 2nd Hengdian Film and TV Festival of China for her performance.

2015–present: Breakout and leading roles
In 2015, Zhang starred in the historical romance web drama Go Princess Go. The low-budget series unexpectedly became a commercial hit, and shot Zhang to fame. Following her fame, Zhang was cast in bigger projects.

In 2016, Zhang starred in the romance film I Belonged to You alongside Deng Chao. The film was a commercial success and earned more than 800 million yuan ($118 million) at the box office.

In 2017, she starred in comedy film Father and Son with Da Peng and Fan Wei, and in fantasy adventure film Legend of the Naga Pearls with Darren Wang. She also featured in the war film The Founding of an Army as Soong Mei-ling, as well as fantasy-mystery film Legend of the Demon Cat directed by Chen Kaige. Zhang was nominated at the Hundred Flowers Award for Best Supporting Actress with her performance as Soong.

In 2018, Zhang starred in the romantic comedy drama The Evolution Of Our Love alongside Zhang Ruoyun. The same year, she starred as the female lead Ying Huanhuan in fantasy-action drama Martial Universe alongside Yang Yang.

In 2019, Zhang starred in the aviation disaster film The Captain as a flight attendant. The same year she starred in the workplace romance drama Crocodile and Plover Bird as an aspiring environmentalist.

In 2020, Zhang appeared in CCTV New Year's Gala for the first time, performing a dance number titled "Quan". She is set to star in the historical film A'mai Joins the Army as the titular character. The same year, she was cast in the wuxia drama Sword Snow Stride written by Wang Juan.

From May 20 to August 5, 2022, Zhang participated in the third season of Sisters Who Make Waves, a Chinese survival reality television show where female celebrities over 30 years old competes to debut in a ten-member girl group. She eventually placed tenth in the finals and debuted in X-Sister.

Filmography

Film

Television series

Television shows

Variety show

Discography

Awards and nominations

References

External links 
 

Chinese film actresses
Chinese television actresses
1988 births
Living people
21st-century Chinese actresses
Actresses from Harbin
Beijing Film Academy alumni